Lewis Woodruff may refer to:
 Lewis Bartholomew Woodruff, American judge
 Lewis Thompson Woodruff, officer in the Confederate States Army